The South Australian Championships (1889–1989), also known as the South Australian State Championships  and  later known as the South Australian Open was a professional men's tennis tournament played originally on outdoor grass courts up to 1987 when it switched to hard courts in its final two years. The tournament was staged at Memorial Drive Park tennis complex in Adelaide, South Australia and was part of the Grand Prix tennis circuit from 1972 until 1989.

History
The origins of the South Australian Championships is thought to be traced back to 1880, however other sources give the start date as 1890  when the Adelaide-based South Australian Tennis Championships, the first known recorded winner of the event was Herbert Hambridge  running as part of the men's amateur tour until 1967. The tournament was first staged on courts adjacent to the Adelaide Oval tennis courts, in 1895 it switched to the then newly built Jubilee Exhibition Oval where it remained until 1921. The 1910 edition of the championships staged the Australasian Championships, the champion that year Rodney Heath held the dual title titles of Australasian and South Australian Champion. In 1920 the men's South Australian Championships in Adelaide carried the Australasian title in March and was won by Pat O'Hara Wood. In 1921 the tournament moved location to Memorial Drive Park and would continue to be played there until the tournament finished. From 1969 until 1971 the event was part of the ITF independent tour, in 1972 the tournament became part of the Grand Prix tennis circuit, which ran concurrently with other tours as the World Championship Tennis circuit.

The tournament had a chaotic history over the following years, taking place on the professional tour again in 1974, in 1977, as the Marlboro-sponsored South Australian Men's Tennis Classic, and in 1979, as the South Australian Open, before it started a regular run in 1981 under the latter title. Moved from January to December in the Grand Prix circuit calendars of the early 1980s, the South Australian Open sealed its place as the opening event of the season in 1987, when it was scheduled again in January, following the return of the Australian Open as the first Grand Slam event of the year. After the surface change of the Australian Open, the tournament also switched to hard courts, starting with the 1988 edition when the event was concurrently called the Australian Hard Court Championships however this national championship had been staged in rotation at various cities around Australia since 1938. The 1989 edition would be the last event to be called South Australian Open.

Notes
The winners of the 1988 and 1989 editions of this tournament were simultaneously called Australian Hard Court Champion and South Australian Open champion. This occurred when the South Australian tournament switched from grass to hard courts in 1988. The roll of honor for both of these events are different and as such are treated as two different tournaments, with the exception of these years when they were combined titles.

Past finals

Men's singles

Men's doubles

See also
 Australian Hard Court Championships

References

Sources
 http://www.atpworldtour.com/results archive
 https://app.thetennisbase.com/South Australian Champions Roll of Honour

External links

Grand Prix tennis circuit
Grass court tennis tournaments
Hard court tennis tournaments
Sport in Adelaide
Defunct tennis tournaments in Australia